Punjabi folklore, more particularly its folksongs, is said to be the autobiography of its people.

Folklore is the body of expressive culture, including tales, music, dance, legends, oral history, proverbs, jokes, popular beliefs, customs, and so forth within a particular population comprising the traditions (including oral traditions) of that culture, subculture, or group. It is also the set of practices through which those expressive genres are shared. The academic and usually ethnographic study of folklore is sometimes called folkloristics.

List of Punjabi folklore

Punjabi Sikhs and Hindus 

The Adventures of raja Rasalu- (Punjabi:ਰਾਜਾ ਰਸਾਲੂ)
The Chronicles of the Nang
Sakhi Sarwar and Dani Jatti
Dhanna Bhagat
Sarwar 
The Legend of Guru Gugga
Princess Adhik Anup Dai
The Legend of Sila Dai
The Story of Raja Mahi Parkash of Sarmor
The Story of Syama, Lord of Sohini
The Song of Negi Bahadur
Madana the Brave, Lord of Chaura
The Legend of Safidon
Princess Niwal Dai
The Genealogies of Lal Beg
The Legend of Raja Gopi Chand
The Story of Raja Chandarbhan and Rani Chand Karan
Songs About Namdev
Sakhi Sarwar and Jati
The Marriage of Sakhi Sarwar
The Ballad of Chuhar Singh
Sansar Chand of Kangra and Fatteh Parkash of Sarmor
Raja Jagat Singh of Nurpur
The Story of Raja Jagdeo
Raja Nal
The Legend of Raja Jagdeo
Raja Nal
The Legend of Raja Dhol
Raja Rattan Sin of Chhittaur
Sarwan and Farjian
Puran Bhagat
Sucha Singh Soorma
Jeona Maur
Loona
Kehar Singh Ram Kaur
Sham Kaur/sham Singh/sham Lal
Dhol Sammi
Kaulan
Manu Guggu
Ustaad Harman

Punjabi Muslims 

The Marriage of Ghazi Salar
The Ballad Of Isa Baniya
The Ballad of Isa Bapari
Hyms to Abdu Iiah Shah of Samin
The Adventures of Mir Chakur
Ismail Khan S Grandmother
The Bracelet-Maker of Jhang
Heer Ranjha
Mirza Sahiba
Sassi Punnun
Sohni Mahiwal
Shirin Farhad
Yusuf and Zulaikha
Dulla Bhatti

References

Further reading

External links

The Legends Of The Punjab : Temple, R. C.
The Legend of Guru Gugga
Puran Bhagat
Guru Gugga
Loona by Shiv Kumar Batalvi
The Marriage of Ghazi Salar
Raja Jagdeo
Raja Gopi Chand
 Arif Lohar Sings Mirza
Punjabi Folksongs explained in English
The Adventures of Mir Chakur
The Ballad Of Isa Baniya
Princess Adhik Anup Dhai
Madna the Brave

 
Indian folklore
Pakistani folklore
Punjabi culture